No For An Answer is a musical play by Marc Blitzstein.  It was staged by W. E. Watts at Mecca Temple, west 55th Street, New York, on Sunday, January 5, 1941.  Although it was supposed to have a limited engagement, it ran for two additional Sundays.  There was no scenery and Marc Blitzstein was at the piano.  It was an experiment under an agreement between the Dramatists Guild and Actors Equity.  The cast included Olive Deering, Lloyd Gough, Martin Pitt, Norma Green, and Curt Conway.  It marked the New York debut of Broadway icon, Carol Channing.  It was much discussed prior to its opening and Random House accepted it for publication just before its production.  Brooks Atkinson stated in his review of the work in The New York Times, "it is very exciting in performance, which is all that matters." Although Aaron Copland called it one of "the most original works in that form composed in this county," the play was a failure.

After the first Sunday night performance, New York City License Commissioner Paul Moss issued a ban on further performances because the Mecca Temple lacked a theater license and the auditorium had many building violations.  He warned that if anyone tried to present the show the following week, they would be stopped by police and firemen.

The work was not in step with the times and no one would underwrite a full production.  A later concert performance in 1960 (Blitzstein again at the piano) constitutes the entire performance history of the piece during Blitzstein's lifetime.  Howard Taubman reviewing the 1960 production for The New York Times, said, "it bogs down in a swamp of pedestrian cliches." The show finally received a fully staged production at the American Conservatory Theater in San Francisco on October 22, 2001.

Plot 
The plot of No For An Answer is the life and fate of the Diogenes Club, a social club of Greek-American waiters, hotel-workers, restaurant-workers, chefs, laundresses, chambermaids, taxi-drivers, who are out-of-work.

Songs 

 “The Song of the Bat” (sung by Charles Potacheck & Chorus)
 “Take the Book” (sung by Charles Potacheck & Chorus)
 “Gina” (sung by Hester Sondergaard)
 “Secret Singing” (sung by Lloyd Gough & Olive Deering)
 “Dimples” (sung by Coby Ruskin & Carol Channing)
 “Fraught” (sung by Carol Channing & Coby Ruskin)
 “Francie” (sung by Michael Loring & Norma Green)

 “No for an Answer” (sung by Ensemble)
 “Penny Candy” (sung by Curt Conway)
 “Mike” (sung by Bert Conway)
 “The Purest Kind of Guy” (sung by Curt Conway)
 “Nick” (sung by Martin Wolfson)
 “Make the Heart Be Stone” (sung by Ensemble)
 "No For An Answer" (sung by Martin Wolfson and Ensemble)

Excerpted scenes 
ACT I
 War of the Beasts and the Birds, The (from Act I Sc.1)
 Gina (from Act I Sc.3)
 Secret Singing (Act I Sc.4)
 Argument, The: What Is Capitalism? (Act I Sc.5)
 Fraught (from Act I Sc.6)
 Dimples (from Act I Sc.6)
 Outside Agitator (From Act I Sc.6)
 Francie (Act I Sc.8)
 Did They Think They Could Get Away With That? (from Act I Sc.11)
 Insist Song (Finale Act I)

ACT II
 Penny Candy (from Act II Sc.1)
 In the Clear (from Act II Sc.1)
 Get Mine (Act II Sc.3)
 Expatriate (from Act II Sc.5)
 Weep for Me (from Act II Sc.7)
 Mild and Lovely (from Act II Sc.7)
 Lullaby (Act II Sc.9)
 Purest Kind of a Guy, The (from Act II Sc.10)
 Insist Song (Finale Act II)

References

Additional sources
 
 
 

1941 plays
Greek-American culture in New York City